Barrenechea is a surname. Notable people with the surname include:

Agustín Barrenechea (born 1979), American football linebacker
Alejandro Barrenechea (born 1976), Spanish gymnast
Ana María Barrenechea (1913–2010), Argentine writer, linguist and literary critic
Claudia Barrenechea (born 1977), Chilean biathlete
Julio Barrenechea (1910–1979), Chilean writer, politician and diplomat
Miguel Barrenechea (born 1947), Mexican sports shooter
Raúl Porras Barrenechea (1897-1960), Peruvian diplomat, historian and politician